Akka Kuruvi is a 2022 Indian Tamil-language family drama film directed by Samy and produced by Madurai Muthu Movies and Kanavu Thozhirsalai. The film stars newcomers Master Maheen and Baby Davia in the lead roles with a cameo appearance from Kathir and Varsha Bollamma. The film's music is composed by Ilaiyaraaja, with cinematography handled by Utpal V Nayanar and editing done by Manigandan Sivakumar. The film is an official remake of the 1997 Iranian film Children of Heaven written and directed by Majid Majidi, which was nominated for the Academy Award for Best Foreign Language Film in the same year. The film was released in theatres on 6 May 2022.

Synopsis
To not burden their impoverished parents, two siblings decide to share a pair of shoes after the brother loses the sister's. While this turns out to be more difficult than they imagined but fate offers a chance in the form of a marathon.

Cast
 Master Maheen as Deva
 Kathir as older Deva (cameo appearance)
 Baby Davia as Sara
 Varsha Bollamma as older Sara (cameo appearance)
 V. S. Kumar as Deva's and Sara's father
 Thara Jagathambi as Deva's and Sara's mother

Reception
M Suganth of The Times of India rated the film with 2/5 stars, stating that, "An underwhelming remake of a beloved Iranian film. The film largely banks on Ilaiyaraaja's background score to make us invested, and the maestro comes up with a suitably Insistent score that keeps nudging us towards the emotions that we are meant to feel. This and the inherent feel-goodness in the story are what keep the film afloat." A critic from Newstodaynet.com said Akka Kuruvi is a movie that deserves a good watch. Dinamalar rated the film with 2.75/5 stars. A reviewer from Maalaimalar gave a rating of 5.5 out on 10 and called the film a summer feast.Kirubhakar Purushothaman critic from Cinema Express noted that "Maybe, there is a third and unintentional use of Akka Kuruvi - the film helps us learn how the same story can be made into a classic or, like this case, an embarrassment." gave 1 star out of 5 stars.

Soundtrack
The soundtrack and score is composed by Ilaiyaraaja and the album featured three songs. All the songs were written by Ilaiyaraaja himself.

See also
 Children of Heaven, a 1997 Iranian film.
Homerun, a 2003 Singapore adaptation of Children of Heaven.
Bumm Bumm Bole, a 2010 Indian Hindi adaptation of Children of Heaven.

References

External links[edit] 

 

2022 drama films
2022 films